Saint-Guidon (French) or Sint Guido (Dutch) is a Brussels Metro station on the western branch of line 5. It is located in the municipality of Anderlecht, in the western part of Brussels, Belgium.

The station opened on 6 October 1982 as part of the Beekkant–Saint Guidon extension of former line 1B. Prior to the opening of an extension to Veeweyde/Veeweide on 5 July 1985, the station was the western terminus of the metro. Following the reorganisation of the Brussels Metro on 4 April 2009, it is served by line 5.

Area
Nearby sights include the Collegiate Church of St. Peter and St. Guido, for which the station was named; Erasmus House; the old beguinage of Anderlecht (now a museum dedicated to religious community life); and Astrid Park, which is home to the Constant Vanden Stock Stadium, where R.S.C. Anderlecht football club play their home games.

External links

Brussels metro stations
Anderlecht